Coronel Marcelino Maridueña Canton is a canton of Ecuador, located in the Guayas Province.  Its capital is the town of Coronel Marcelino Maridueña.  Its population at the 2001 census was 11,054.

Demographics
Ethnic groups as of the Ecuadorian census of 2010:
Mestizo  82.0%
Montubio  6.8%
White  5.5%
Afro-Ecuadorian  4.3%
Indigenous  1.3%
Other  0.1%

References

Cantons of Guayas Province